In group theory, a branch of mathematics, Frattini's argument is an important lemma in the structure theory of finite groups.  It is named after Giovanni Frattini, who used it in a paper from 1885 when defining the Frattini subgroup of a group. The argument was taken by Frattini, as he himself admits, from a paper of Alfredo Capelli dated 1884.

Frattini's Argument

Statement

Proof
Then by the above, it must be -conjugate to : that is, for some 

,

and so
  
.

Thus,

,

and therefore . But  was arbitrary, and so

Applications
 Frattini's argument can be used as part of a proof that any finite nilpotent group is a direct product of its Sylow subgroups.

External links
 Frattini's Argument on ProofWiki

References

     (See Chapter 10, especially Section 10.4.)

Lemmas in group theory
Articles containing proofs